Skirlington is a hamlet in the Holderness area of the East Riding of Yorkshire, England.

It forms part of the civil parish of Atwick.

Primarily, Skirlington is a caravan site and leisure park with a popular Sunday market that is open all year and includes Bank Holiday Mondays, with an indoor area and outdoor area for over 300 stalls, it also opens on Wednesdays in July and August. There is car parking for over 2,000 cars.

References

External links

Villages in the East Riding of Yorkshire
Holderness